Paul Hyde (born 7 April 1963) is an English former professional footballer. Born in Hayes, he played professionally for Wycombe Wanderers (290 appearances), Leicester City (7 appearances in the Premier League) and Leyton Orient, where he made over 70 appearances until he had to retire due to a multiple fracture to the leg. He later returned to non-league football with Dover Athletic in the Conference league (350 appearances).

Honours
Wycombe Wanderers
FA Trophy: 1992–93

References

1963 births
Living people
Leyton Orient F.C. players
Dover Athletic F.C. players
Leicester City F.C. players
English footballers
Wycombe Wanderers F.C. players
Canterbury City F.C. players
Association football goalkeepers